The 2010 BC Lions season was the 53rd season for the team in the Canadian Football League and their 57th overall. The Lions finished the season in third place in the West Division with a second consecutive 8–10 record and qualified for the playoffs by winning their last game of the season. If they had lost, the Edmonton Eskimos would have qualified instead. The team had a dismal start, posting a 1–7 record to start the season, but won seven of their last 10 games to qualify for the playoffs for the 14th consecutive season. The Lions played the Saskatchewan Roughriders in the West Semi-Final, but lost the game in double overtime 41–38.

Due to renovations to BC Place, the Lions played at a temporary stadium located on the site of their old home field, Empire Stadium. Additionally, Head Coach and General Manager Wally Buono announced that training camp would be held in Kamloops for the next three seasons, beginning with 2010.

Offseason

CFL draft

Preseason 

 Games played with white uniforms.

Regular season

Season standings

Season schedule 

 Games played with colour uniforms.
 Games played with white uniforms.
 Games played with alternate uniforms.
 Games played with retro uniforms.

Roster

Coaching staff

Player stats 
As of the end of Week 13 (Game 12):

Passing

Rushing

Receiving

Awards and records
Solomon Elimimian (LB) – CFL's Most Outstanding Rookie Award

2010 CFL All-Stars
DB – Ryan Phillips, CFL All-Star
K – Paul McCallum, CFL All-Star

CFL Western All-Stars
OG – Jovan Olafioye, Western All-Star
DE – Brent Johnson, Western All-Star
LB – Korey Banks, Western All-Star
DB – Ryan Phillips, Western All-Star
K – Paul McCallum, Western All-Star
ST – Yonus Davis, Western All-Star

Milestones

Playoffs

Schedule

 Games played with white uniforms.

Bracket

West Semi-Final

References

BC Lions seasons
Bc Lions Season, 2010
2010 in British Columbia